All the World in a Design School is a 2015 Swedish documentary film made for television about a group of international students at one of the world's top ranked industrial design schools, Umeå Institute of Design in Umeå, Västerbotten, Sweden.

Umeå Institute of Design is well respected by the industrial design world for its unique study and design methods in addition to a multicultural environment that has shaped generations of industrial designers.

This documentary, from inside Umeå Institute of Design, was shot during the school's 25th anniversary and follow a group of students from all corners of the world in close-up portraits during a time when the school struggles to maintain its attractiveness. New regulations by the Riksdag of Sweden mean non-European students are charged steep tuition fees.

The film is produced by Freedom From Choice, Filmpool Nord and Sveriges Television, and directed by award-winning Swedish filmmaker Mattias Löw.

The documentary won the Best Television Program Award at the Northern Character Film & TV Festival in Murmansk, Russia, the Best Documentary Feature Film Award at the Atlas & Aeris Awards in Boston, United States, a Remi Gold Award at the WorldFest - Houston International Film Festival in Texas, United States and has received international attention with nominations and official selections at several recognized film festivals including Camerimage in Bydgoszcz, Poland.

References

External links 
 
 
 

2015 television films
2015 films
2015 documentary films
Swedish documentary films
2010s Swedish-language films
Umeå University
Industrial design
Films about education
Documentary films about higher education
Sveriges Television original programming
Films directed by Tomas Mattias Löw
2010s English-language films
2015 multilingual films
Swedish multilingual films
2010s Swedish films